Oshtorankuh is a mountain that is located in city of azna, in Lorestan. With an elevation of 4150 metres, the Oshtorankuh is the highest mountain in Lorestan Province. Stretched in a northwest-southeast direction, the Oshtorankuh is situated in the Zagros Mountains and is among the high mountains of this range.

Oshtorankuh means “mountain of camels” in Persian and is made of two words, “oshtoran” which is the plural form of ”oshtor” or “shotor” meaning “camel” with the plural suffix “an” and “kuh” that means “mountain”. So because of its eight high peaks of more than 4000 metres that look like a caravan of camels, this mountain is called “Oshtorkuh” or “Oshtorankuh”.

Situated in the Lorestan geologic and structural zone of Iran, the Oshtorankuh is mainly made of Jurassic-Cretaceous dolomitic limestone. Being a high mountain with snow-covered peaks and glacial valleys, the Oshtorankuh has a cold mountain climate with cold winters and cool summers.

Mountain pistachio, rhubarb, goat's thorn and wild plants are among the various forms of the mountain's vegetation. Animals include brown bears, foxes, grey wolves, boars, hyenas, squirrels, wild cats and mountain goats. Eagles, quails, and owls are among different birds found in the vicinity of this mountain. The “Oshtorankuh Protected Nature Reserve” is one of the protected nature reserves of Iran which includes a region of 98,000 hectares. Gahar Lake is within this protected region. The different tribes of Bakhtiyari Charlang branch live in the foothills of the Oshtorankuh.

The Dez Dam starts in the Zagros mountains near the Oshtorankuh.

References

Mountains of Iran
Mountaineering in Iran
Zagros Mountains
Landforms of Lorestan Province
Four-thousanders of the Zagros
Mountains of Lorestan Province